Athemistus conifer is a species of beetle in the family Cerambycidae. It was described by Per Olof Christopher Aurivillius in 1917 and is known from Australia.

References

Athemistus
Beetles described in 1917